Med Airlines is a Moroccan cargo airline based in Casablanca. It operates cargo charters from its main base at Mohammed V International Airport, Casablanca.

Destinations
As of 2010, Med Airlines served the following scheduled destinations with its cargo flights:

France
 Paris – Paris Orly Airport

Mali
 Bamako – Bamako-Sénou International Airport

Morocco
 Casablanca – Mohammed V International Airport base
 Tangier – Tangier Ibn Battouta Airport

Portugal
 Lisbon – Portela Airport
 Porto – Francisco de Sá Carneiro Airport

Senegal
 Dakar – Léopold Sédar Senghor International Airport

Spain
 Zaragoza – Zaragoza Airport

Fleet
As of 2010, the Med Airlines fleet consisted of the following aircraft:

References

External links

Airlines of Morocco
Cargo airlines
Companies based in Casablanca